Jean Ané (born 25 July 1961) is a French sports shooter. He competed in the mixed trap event at the 1984 Summer Olympics.

References

External links

1961 births
Living people
French male sport shooters
Olympic shooters of France
Shooters at the 1984 Summer Olympics
Place of birth missing (living people)